A tutor is somebody who helps teach another.

Tutor or TUTOR may also refer to:

Aviation
 Avro Tutor
 Canadair CT-114 Tutor
 Slingsby Kirby Tutor
 Slingsby Motor Tutor
 Timm N2T Tutor

Computing
 TUTOR, a programming language
 Tomy Tutor, a home computer

Literature
 The Tutor, a play by Jakob Michael Reinhold Lenz
 The Tutor (Brecht), an adaptation of that play by Bertolt Brecht

People
 Gaius Vellaeus Tutor, ancient Roman senator
 Glennray Tutor (born 1950), American painter
 Ronald Tutor (born 1940/1941), American businessman
 Tracy Tutor (born 1975), American real estate agent and reality television personality

Other uses
 Tutor (education), an officer in the British university system
 Tutor.com, an online tutoring company
 Tutor Systems, an educational game

See also

 Tudor (disambiguation)